George Alfred Lefroy (August 1854 – 1 January 1919) was an eminent Anglican priest and missionary in India during the late nineteenth and early twentieth centuries.

Lefroy was born into an eminent Irish family in County Down in  August 1854: his father was Jeffrey Lefroy, Dean of Dromore, and his grandfather, Thomas Langlois Lefroy, Chief Justice of the Queen's Bench, Ireland. He was educated at Marlborough and Trinity College, Cambridge and ordained in 1879. He joined the Cambridge Mission to Delhi the same year and eventually became head of the SPG Mission in Delhi. In 1899 he became Bishop of Lahore. Translated to become Bishop of Calcutta in 1912. Lefroy was known for his regular participation in public religious debates and for his lectures among Muslims and Hindus. He also joined fellow missionary C. F. Andrews in opposing western racism towards Indians. He became a Doctor of Divinity (DD) and died in post on 1 January 1919.

Works

References

1854 births
1919 deaths
People educated at Marlborough College
Alumni of Trinity College, Cambridge
Irish expatriate Protestant bishops
Irish Anglican missionaries
British Anglican missionaries
Anglican missionaries in India
Anglican missionaries in Pakistan
Anglican bishops of Lahore
Anglican bishops of Calcutta
19th-century Anglican bishops in Asia
20th-century Anglican bishops in Asia